The Republican Social Movement (MSR) was a far-right political party in Spain. It was registered at the Ministry of Interior on November 30, 1999, with offices in Barcelona. The following year it merged with Vértice Social Español to form what it called a "Social Patriotic force".

By its members' own admission, as well as by that of the bulk of the far-right public opinion, the MSR was roughly inscribed in what is usually called the Third Position, and adheres to the commonplace strategy of defending socializing (and at times leftist) doctrines abroad, whereas adopting conservative and anti-immigration stances at a domestic level.  Its slogan was 'Spain-Republic-Socialization'.

In the VII National Congress all the participants decided to terminate the movement's experience. MSR dissolved itself with an official announcement
30 of January 2018.

Policies
The party has campaigned against immigration into Spain, Turkish membership of the European Union and global capitalism. They support a large programme of re-nationalisation of industries such as electricity and transport. In terms of foreign policies the party takes a strongly pro-Palestinian approach to the Middle East question, criticising Israel alleging that the "Zionist army are committing daily crimes against the Palestinian people." In addition to supporting the Venezuelan government of Hugo Chavez, they have also called for the withdrawal of Spanish troops in the Balkans and condemned the American led invasion of Iraq. In the 2000 General Election the party supported the platform of España 2000.

Press
The party publishes Tribuna de Europa and Libertad.

Sectoral organizations
Labour: Unión Sindical de Trabajadores - UST
Youth: Liga Joven
Ecology: Hispania Verde
Think-tank: Alternativa Europea
Culture: Círculo de Estudios La Emboscadura - CELE

Elections results

Congress of Deputies / Senate

European Parliament

References

Bibliography

External links
MSR website
MSR Twitter in English

Far-right political parties in Spain
Fascist parties in Spain
Nationalist parties in Spain
Neo-fascist parties
Political parties established in 1999
Republican parties in Spain
Spanish nationalism
Right-wing populism in Spain
Third Position
1999 establishments in Spain
Political parties disestablished in 2018
Falangist parties